Murtuza is a given name originating from various Arab countries.  The correct Arabic pronunciation of "Murtuza" is "Mur-thu-dha", however, most people like to pronounce it as 'Muur-tuu-zaa'.  It is an Arabic word that means 'leader' or the 'chosen one'.It is a common name in Dawoodi Bohras sect.

Notable people with the name include:
 Bulbul (Murtuza Mammadov) (1897–1961), Azerbaijani vocalist and performer of opera and folk music
 Murtuza Mukhtarov (1865–1920), Azerbaijani oil industrialist
 Golam Murtuza (1995-), Indian Educationist and Researher